Gao Chang (born January 29, 1987 in Jinan, Shandong, China) is a Chinese swimmer, who competed at the 2004 Summer Olympics and who was a part of China's 2008 Olympic Team. She was part of the Chinese 4 x 100 m medley relay team at the 2012 Summer Olympics.  Gao Chang won the gold in the 50-metre backstroke final of 2010 Asian Games.

Major achievements
2004 Olympic Games - 15th 100 m back;
2004 World Short-Course Championships - 2nd 50 m/100 m back;
2005 World Championships - 2nd 50 m back;
2005 Asian Winter Games - 1st 50 m/100 m back;
2005 National Games - 1st 100 m back;
2006 World Short-Course Championships - 3rd 50 m/100 m back;
2007 Asian Games - 2nd 50 m back;
2008 World Short-Course Championships - 2nd 50 m back
2010 Asian Games - 1st 50 m back

Records
2004 National Championships - 28.48, 50 m back (AR);
2004 Short-Course World Cup - 58.49, 100 m back (NR);
2005 World Championships - 28.31, 50 m back (Tournament Record);
2008 World Short-Course Championships - 26.70 50 m back (AR)

See also
List of Asian records in swimming
List of Chinese records in swimming

References

1987 births
Living people
Swimmers from Shandong
Olympic swimmers of China
Swimmers at the 2004 Summer Olympics
Swimmers at the 2012 Summer Olympics
World Aquatics Championships medalists in swimming
Sportspeople from Jinan
Medalists at the FINA World Swimming Championships (25 m)
Asian Games medalists in swimming
Swimmers at the 2006 Asian Games
Swimmers at the 2010 Asian Games
Universiade medalists in swimming
Asian Games gold medalists for China
Asian Games silver medalists for China
Asian Games bronze medalists for China
Medalists at the 2006 Asian Games
Medalists at the 2010 Asian Games
Universiade gold medalists for China
Medalists at the 2011 Summer Universiade
Chinese female backstroke swimmers
21st-century Chinese women